Hamam al-Sammara (also spelled Hamaam as-Sumara; transliteration: "the Bath of the Samaritans" or "the Brown Bath") is the only active Turkish bath remaining in Gaza, located in the Zeitoun Quarter of the Old City. It is currently owned by Salim Abdullah al-Wazeer.

History
Although rumored to date back to pre-Islamic times in Gaza, a plaque in the lobby of the bathhouse proclaims that Hamam al-Sammara was restored in 1320 by the Mamluk governor of the city Sanjar al-Jawli. It is the only Turkish bathhouse in Gaza, of the original five, that continues to function. According to Theodore E. Dowling writing in 1913, in 1584, a Samaritan community existed in Gaza and possessed a large synagogue and two bathhouses. "One of them still bears the name "the Bath of the Samaritans". One of the governors of Gaza who belonged to the Ridwan dynasty, desired to acquire the bathhouse, but the owner refused to sell it and the indignant governor had him hanged in front of the building. It is believed the Samaritans were expelled from the city before the turn of the 16th century. 

The Wazeer family who owned Hamam as-Sammara decided to tear it down and construct a new building. However, they were faced with an ancient water heating system and traditional bathhouse that no longer functioned properly and which would be extremely costly to repair. Therefore, the Islamic University of Gaza and the United Nations Development Programme partly restored Hamam as-Sammara after it was nearly demolished due to rising costs of maintenance. The bathhouse still uses an old system of wood-fueled ovens and aqueducts, and for this reason, the Wazeer family has been collecting funds to renovate the aqueducts beneath the buildings marble slabs.

Structure and services
Hamam as-Sammara consists of several rooms with varied temperatures. Customers first leave their belongings with the clerk, then proceed to the steam room, after which they bathe in warm water. Sprinklers shower cool water on bathers to prevent overheating, and canisters are provided for ladling water. The final stage involves wading in the maghtas, a small pool filled with hot water, about a meter deep. After bathing, customers enter the room-temperature lounge. Massages are also available. Massages are undertaken by a mudalik (a professional "scrubber"), while the client soaks in the steam room.

Bathhouses are used as a folk remedy for rheumatism and infertility, and it is customary for mothers to bring their 40-day-old infants to Hamam as-Sammara for a blessing. It has a social importance, especially to women, as a place where community members come together to socialize. Services are open to both men and women, but at different times of the day.

References

Bibliography

Mamluk architecture in the State of Palestine
Buildings and structures in Gaza City
Public baths in the Arab world
Tourist attractions in the State of Palestine